Akçapınar is a village in the Çemişgezek District, Tunceli Province, Turkey. The village is populated by Kurds  and had a population of 280 in 2021. 

The hamlets of Koyunardı, Mengöçek and Topluca are attached to the village. Koyunardı is populated by Turks.

References 

Villages in Çemişgezek District
Kurdish settlements in Tunceli Province